A list of British films released in 1922.

1922

See also
 1922 in film
 1922 in the United Kingdom

References

External links
 

1922
Films
Lists of 1922 films by country or language
1920s in British cinema